Jagadeka Veera (Kannada: ಜಗದೇಕ ವೀರ) is a 1991 Indian Kannada film, directed by H. R. Bhargava and produced by B. Vijaya Kumar, H. Ramamurthy, N. Venkatesh, M. Rajagopal, K. Varadaraj and S. A. Sathyam. The film stars Vishnuvardhan, Ashok, Rohini and Thriveni in the lead roles. The film has musical score by Rajan–Nagendra.

Cast

Vishnuvardhan
Ashok
Rohini
Thriveni
Pandari Bai
Malathi
Kamalashree
Sheela
Seema
Bhavani
K. S. Ashwath
Ramesh Bhat
Sudheer
Sathyajith
Sihikahi Chandru
Prakash Rai
Rajanand
Bangalore Nagesh
Dingri Nagaraj
Saikumar
Mandeep Roy
Shankar Patil
M. S. Karanth
Shani Mahadevappa
Janardhan
Bemel Somanna
B. K. Shankar
Shankar Bhat
M. S. L. Murthy
Srishailan

References

External links
 

1991 films
1990s Kannada-language films
Films scored by Rajan–Nagendra
Films directed by H. R. Bhargava